David "Peanuts" Thomas (born September 11, 1951) is a former American football cornerback.

Thomas was born in Newark, New Jersey in 1951 and attended William M. Raines High School in Jacksonville, Florida. He played college football at Texas Southern from 1970 to 1973.

He began playing professional football in the World Football League in 1974 and 1975 as cornerback and a punt and kick return specialist for the Memphis Southmen. He was named to the All-WFL team in 1974. He later played in the Canadian Football League (CFL) for the Toronto Argonauts. He appeared in ten CFL games during the 1977 and 1978 seasons.

References

1951 births
Living people
Memphis Southmen players
Toronto Argonauts players
Players of American football from Newark, New Jersey
Players of Canadian football from Newark, New Jersey
Texas Southern Tigers football players
American football cornerbacks
Canadian football defensive backs